Inchara Rao is an Indian playback singer and performer. She won the award for 'Best Female Playback Singer' SIIMA 2016, and the Filmfare Awards South 2016 as the Filmfare Award for Best Female Playback Singer – Kannada. She started her career by participating in the singing reality television show, Sa Re Ga Ma Pa Kannada in its first season. She was in the final three. After that, she released her debut song, Nanna Stylu Berene, from the movie Geleya, an item song.

She is best known for her song Kareyole from the film Rangitaranga, which won her several awards, including the Filmfare Award for Best Female Playback Singer – Kannada and the SIIMA Award for Best Female Playback Singer – Kannada.

She has also sung 'Ayomaya' from the movie Godhi Banna Sadharana Mykattu.

Inchara was born in Shimoga, a  town in Malenadu, the evergreen western ghats of Karnataka, India.

Discography

References

External links
 

Living people
Indian women playback singers
Kannada playback singers
Filmfare Awards South winners
Singers from Karnataka
21st-century Indian singers
Year of birth missing (living people)
Film musicians from Karnataka
21st-century Indian women singers
Women musicians from Karnataka